Nata is a village in Central District of Botswana. It is located in the northern part of the district, and is served by Nata Airport. The population was 6,802 at the 2011 census. The village of Nata lies along the Nata River, which carries its rainy season flow to the Makgadikgadi Pans, a seasonal hypersaline lake.

See also
Zoroga
Mathangwane Village

References

Populated places in Central District (Botswana)
Villages in Botswana